The 2018–19 Botola, also known as Botola Maroc Telecom for sponsorship reasons, is the 62nd season of the Premier League and the 8th under its new format of Moroccan Pro League, the top Moroccan professional league for association football clubs, since its establishment in 1956. The season started on 25 August 2018 and ended on 15 May 2019.

IR Tanger came into the season as defending champions of the 2017–18 season. Mouloudia Oujda and Youssoufia Berrechid entered as the two promoted teams from the 2017–18 Botola 2.

Teams

Stadium and locations

Number of teams by regions

Personnel and kits 

1. On the back of shirt.
2. On the sleeves.
3. On the shorts.
 Maroc Telecom is a sponsor for all the league's teams.
 Additionally, referee kits are made by Adidas.

Managerial changes

League table

Results

Season statistics

Top goalscorers

Top assists

Hat-tricks

(H) – Home ; (A) – Away

Annual awards 
The UMFP (Union Marocaine des Footballeurs Professionnels), in partnership with the Royal Moroccan Football Federation, organized the Night of Stars Award in its 5th edition, which celebrated the brilliants of the Botola Pro for the 2018/19 season.

See also
 2018 Moroccan Throne Cup
 2018–19 Botola 2
 2018-19 CAF Champions League
 2018-19 CAF Confederation Cup
 2018–19 Arab Club Champions Cup

References

External links 
BOTOLA FACEBOOK
 Fédération Royale Marocaine de Football

Botola seasons
Morocco
Botola